Acsala is a monotypic lichen moth genus in the monotypic tribe Acsalina of the family Erebidae. Its only species, Acsala anomala, can be found in the US state of Alaska. Both the genus and species were first described by Foster H. Benjamin in 1935.

References

External links

Lithosiini
Moths of North America
Monotypic moth genera
Moths described in 1935